Kızılkaya, also called Kızılkaya Peak, is a summit located in Aladağlar National Park between the provinces of Niğde and Kayseri, Turkey.

Until recently, the highest peak there was Demirkazık Peak, but in 2008, the height of Kızılkaya was registered as 3771.418 meters in GPS measurements made with the initiative of the General Directorate of Mapping and the Turkish Mountaineering Federation.

References

Mountains of Turkey
Landforms of Kayseri Province
Landforms of Niğde Province
Three-thousanders of Turkey